The 1879 Wellington City mayoral election was part of the New Zealand local elections held that same year to decide who would take the office of Mayor of Wellington.

Background
Mayor Joe Dransfield resigned in May 1879. A special meeting of the city council was called on the requisition of three councillors for the purpose of electing a councillor to fulfil the duties of mayor pending the election of a new mayor by the public. Council members elected councillor George Allen to do so.

Election results
The following table gives the election results:

Notes

References

Mayoral elections in Wellington
1879 elections in New Zealand
Politics of the Wellington Region
1870s in Wellington
November 1879 events